Buthus ibericus is a scorpion species found in western Spain and Portugal.

References 

Buthidae
Animals described in 2004
Scorpions of Europe
Fauna of Spain